Kittie Party is a Hindi television serial that aired on Zee TV. The story is based on the lives of 8 women who get together in a function called 'Kittie Party' where they gossip, reveal their emotional and psychological self-expressions, and share secrets amidst friends.

Concept 
The story is based on the lives of eight women who get together in their social meeting ground called 'Kittie Party' every month to party and share their life moments with each other. The story goes through the lives of these eight women: Manju, Rewa, Vidya, Tina, Pixie, Niloufer, Kuku, and Natasha, and explores their individual lives through these meetings — their hopes, disappointments, aspirations, and longings. Each woman's character is reflected clearly through her interaction with others as well as through what she projects at these particular meetings.

The show brought the chic urban tribe of women and their sagas to the fore, with a progressive and often bold take on relationships.

Cast 
 Poonam Dhillon as Manju Manoviraj Saxena
 Maya Alagh as Vidya
 Preeti Dayal as Niloufer
 Deepshikha Nagpal as Kuku Nagpal
 Kavita Kapoor as Reva Manoviraj Saxena
 Shweta Salve as Tina Sudheer Sharma
 Achint Kaur as Pixie
 Kunika as Vasundhara
 Vivek Mushran as Jay Sinha, Boss of Kuku
 Hitesh Kriplani as Vicky Saxena
 Kiran Kumar as Manoviraj Saxena
 Tony Mirchandani as Daboo
 Pankaj Berry as Ramakant, Manju's Brother in law
 Dolly Minhas as Manju's elder sister
 S M Zaheer as Mr. Sharma, Tina's Father in Law
 Rekha Rao as  Maya Sharma, Tina's Mother in law
Mohan Kapoor as Reva's Brother in law
Raza Murad as Minister Ajeet Kumar            
 Nasir Khan 
 Siddharth Dhawan as Sudheer Sharma
 Abir Goswami as Prateek Sharma, Tina's Brother in law
 Khyaati Khandke Keswani as Aarti, Vidya's Daughter 
 Jyoti Mukherjee
 Anupam Bhattacharya
 Vishal Sabnani
 Sunil Dhawan
 Rohit Roy
 Mayuri Kango as Riya, Ramakant's daughter
 Sonia Kapoor as Piya
 Nushrratt Bharuccha as Chiku
 Kanika Kohli
 Shabnam Kapoor
 Pyumori Mehta
 Mayank Tandon
  Tarun Khanna as Rajveer
  Rituraj Singh
 Shalini Kapoor Sagar as Dinky, Pixie's Friend
 Monaz Mevawala
 Indu Verma
 Roma Bali
 Romi Jaspal
  Zakir Hussain
 Sajid Khan
 as Mr. Sinha

External links
Official Site on Siddhant Cinevision
Kittie Party News Article on Indiantelevision.com
Kittie Party Celebration Article

Indian television soap operas
Zee TV original programming
2002 Indian television series debuts